Qatar competed at the 2014 Summer Youth Olympics, in Nanjing, China from 16 August to 28 August 2014.

Athletics

Qatar qualified one athlete.

Qualification Legend: Q=Final A (medal); qB=Final B (non-medal); qC=Final C (non-medal); qD=Final D (non-medal); qE=Final E (non-medal)

Boys
Track & road events

Equestrian

Qatar qualified a rider.

Gymnastics

Artistic Gymnastics

Qatar qualified one athlete based on its performance at the 2014 Asian Artistic Gymnastics Championships.

Girls

Trampoline

Qatar qualified one athlete based on its performance at the 2014 Asian Trampoline Championships.

Notes: Q=Qualified to Final; R=Reserve

Handball

Qatar qualified a boys' team based on its performance at the 2013 Asian Youth Games

Boys' tournament

Roster

 Omar Abdelfattah
 Noomem Ahmadi
 Nour Ahmed]]
 Irhad Alihodzic
 Adson Bajric
 Salem Braham
 Faruk Colo
 Amor Dhiab
 Ebrahim Ebaid
 Amine Guehis
 Moustafa Heiba
 Abdulaziz Helali
 Bilal Lepenica
 Bozo Subotic

Group stage

Semifinals

Bronze Medal Match

Shooting

Qatar was given a wild card to compete.

Individual

Team

Swimming

Qatar qualified one swimmer.

Boys

Table Tennis

Qatar qualified one athlete based on its performance at the Asian Qualification Event.

Singles

Team

Qualification Legend: Q=Main Bracket (medal); qB=Consolation Bracket (non-medal)

References

2014 in Qatari sport
Nations at the 2014 Summer Youth Olympics
Qatar at the Youth Olympics